HD 110458 is a single star in the southern constellation of Centaurus. It has the Bayer designation w Centauri, while HD 110458 is the star's identifier in the Henry Draper Catalogue. The star has an orange hue and is faintly visible to the naked eye with an apparent visual magnitude of +4.66. It is located at a distance of approximately 191 light years from the Sun based on parallax, but is drifting closer with a radial velocity of −12 km/s. Based on its space motion, in 1972 O. J. Eggen listed it as a probable member of the Hyades group.

The stellar classification of HD 110458 is K0III, which indicates this is an aging giant star that has exhausted the supply of hydrogen at its core. It is estimated to be 2.6 billion years old with 1.7 times the mass of the Sun and has expanded to 11.6 times the girth of the Sun. The star is radiating 61 times the luminosity of the Sun from its enlarged photosphere at an effective temperature of 4,682 K.

References 

K-type giants
Centaurus (constellation)
Centauri, w
Durchmusterung objects
110458
062012
4831